Lyskovsky District is an administrative district (raion), one of the forty in Nizhny Novgorod Oblast, Russia. Municipally, it is incorporated as Lyskovsky Municipal District. It is located in the east of the oblast on both sides of the Volga River. Its administrative center is the town of Lyskovo. Population: 39,964 (2010 Census);  The population of Lyskovo accounts for 54.7% of the district's total population.

History

In the Russian Empire, the territory of what today is Lyskovsky District was
mostly within Makaryevsky Uyezd of Nizhny Novgorod Governorate. The seat of the uyezd was in the town of Makaryev (today's settlement of Makaryevo) on the northern bank of the Volga River, next to the ancient Makaryev Monastery. Until the fire of 1816, Makaryev was home to the annual Makaryev Fair. The administrative offices of the uyezd, however, were located in the village of Lyskovo, which, being located on the southern bank of the Volga, was conveniently served by the Kazan Post Road.

The modern district was established in 1929.

Economy
Lyskovo brewery and vegetable canning plant are well known in the region.

References

Notes

Sources

Districts of Nizhny Novgorod Oblast
States and territories established in 1929